Racha Soula (born 16 February 1994 in La Goulette) is a Tunisian rower. She competed in the single sculls race at the 2012 Summer Olympics and placed 3rd in Final E and 27th overall.

References

1994 births
Living people
Tunisian female rowers
Olympic rowers of Tunisia
Rowers at the 2012 Summer Olympics
21st-century Tunisian women